Lo mejor que me pasó en la vida (English: The best thing that happened to me in life), is the first studio album by singer-songwriter Alex Sirvent. Launched on December 12, 2013 by Alman Music. Some of the songs on this album are part of the soundtrack of the telenovela Lo que la vida me robó.

Track listing

References 

2013 debut albums